Oleksandr Oleksandrovych Khyzhniak (born 3 August 1995) is a Ukrainian amateur boxer. He won gold medals at the 2017 World Championships, 2017 European Championships and the 2019 European Games.

References

External links 
 

1995 births
Living people
Sportspeople from Poltava
Ukrainian male boxers
AIBA World Boxing Championships medalists
European Games gold medalists for Ukraine
European Games bronze medalists for Ukraine
European Games medalists in boxing
Boxers at the 2015 European Games
Boxers at the 2019 European Games
Middleweight boxers
Boxers at the 2020 Summer Olympics
Medalists at the 2020 Summer Olympics
Olympic silver medalists for Ukraine
Olympic medalists in boxing
Olympic boxers of Ukraine
21st-century Ukrainian people